Michael Mucitelli (born December 7, 1983) is an American professional mixed martial artist who competed in Bellator's Light Heavyweight division.

Background
Mucitelli was born in Rochester, New York, but his family moved to Syracuse, New York when he was very young.

During high school, Mucitelli practiced football, basketball and baseball and earned multiple honors within these sports. Influenced by a roommate, Mucitelli has also practiced capoeira.

Mixed martial arts career

Early career
Mucitelli started his professional career in 2010. After two victories, he signed with Bellator.

Bellator Fighting Championships
Mucitelli made his debut on August 24, 2012 at Bellator 73 against then undefeated Matt Van Buren, taking the fight on one week's notice. He won via submission in the first round.

Mucitelli was scheduled to face Dan McGuane on November 16, 2012 at Bellator 81. However, the fight was scrapped after the negative impact caused when a felony charge of involuntary manslaughter committed in July 2005 by McGuane was exposed in the internet. Mucitelli instead faced Shark Fights veteran Matt Uhde in a catchweight bout, which he won via submission in the first round.

Mucitelli faced Brent Dillingham on March 21, 2013 at Bellator 93. For the fifth time in a row he won in the first round, again via submission.

Mucitelli faced Jeff Nader on September 7, 2013 at Bellator 98. The fight ended in a no contest at 1:30 in the first round due to an accidental eye poke that rendered Nader unable to continue.

Mucitelli face Ryan McCurdy on November 8, 2013, at Bellator 107. This marked Mucitelli's first fight out of the first round, as it went the distance with Mucitelli pulling out a hard fought unanimous decision (29–28, 29–28, 29–28).

Mucitelli faced Liam McGeary in the 2014 Summer Series Light Heavyweight Tournament Quarterfinals at Bellator 118 on May 2, 2014. He lost via first-round knockout.

Mucitelli then faced Mark Griffin on September 5, 2014 at Bellator 123. Mucitelli won the fight via armbar submission in just 37 seconds of round one.

Mixed martial arts record

|-
|Loss
|align=center| 7–3 (1)
|Greg Rebello
|KO (punch)
|CES 31
|
|align=center|1
|align=center|3:24
|Lincoln, Rhode Island, United States
|Fought at Heavyweight
|-
|Loss
|align=center| 7–2 (1)
|Tyler King
|Decision (unanimous)
|CES 28: Hawn vs. Loffer
|
|align=center|3
|align=center|5:00
|Lincoln, Rhode Island, United States
|Fought at Heavyweight
|-
|Win
|align=center| 7–1 (1)
|Mark Griffin
|Submission (armbar)
|Bellator 123
|
|align=center|1
|align=center|0:37
|Uncasville, Connecticut, United States
|
|-
|Loss
|align=center| 6–1 (1)
|Liam McGeary
|KO (punch)
|Bellator 118
|
|align=center|1
|align=center|0:22
|Atlantic City, New Jersey, United States
|
|-
|Win
|align=center|6–0 (1)
|Ryan McCurdy
|Decision (unanimous)
|Bellator 107
|
|align=center| 3
|align=center| 5:00
|Thackerville, Oklahoma, United States
|
|-
|NC
|align=center|5–0 (1)
|Jeff Nader
|No contest
|Bellator 98
|
|align=center|1
|align=center|1:30
|Uncasville, Connecticut, United States
|
|-
|Win
|align=center|5–0
|Brent Dillingham
|Submission (armbar)
|Bellator 93
|
|align=center|1
|align=center|2:48
|Lewiston, Maine, United States
|
|-
|Win
|align=center|4–0
|Matt Uhde
|Submission (armbar)
|Bellator 81
|
|align=center|1
|align=center|0:26
|Kingston, Rhode Island, United States
|
|-
|Win
|align=center|3–0
|Matt Van Buren
|Submission (triangle choke)
|Bellator 73
|
|align=center|1
|align=center|3:01
|Tunica Resorts, Mississippi, United States
|
|-
|Win
|align=center|2–0
|Eddie Hardison
|Submission (rear-naked choke)
|MF - Matrix Fights 6
|
|align=center|1
|align=center|1:54
|Philadelphia, Pennsylvania, United States
|
|-
|Win
|align=center|1–0
|Steve Skrzat
|TKO (doctor stoppage)
|CES MMA - Cage of Horrors
|
|align=center|1
|align=center|5:00
|Mashantucket, Connecticut, United States
|

References

1983 births
Living people
Sportspeople from Watertown, New York
Mixed martial artists from New York (state)
American male mixed martial artists
Light heavyweight mixed martial artists
Mixed martial artists utilizing capoeira
American capoeira practitioners